LG&E and KU Energy is a subsidiary of PPL Corporation, based in Louisville, Kentucky. It is composed of the following companies:

Louisville Gas & Electric (LG&E)
Kentucky Utilities (KU)
Old Dominion Power (ODP) (a subsidiary of Kentucky Utilities)

The company was created in 1998, when LG&E Energy, parent of LG&E, acquired KU Energy, parent of KU and ODP. In 2000, Powergen, a British-based company, acquired LG&E Energy, which still operated under that name. In 2002, German-based E.ON acquired Powergen; the following year, in 2003, E.ON transferred the LG&E Energy group to its American subsidiary, E.ON US Holdings.

On April 28, 2010, PPL and E.ON announced a definitive agreement in which PPL was to acquire E.ON US for $7.625 billion. The sale was closed on November 1, 2010, with E-ON US becoming LG&E and KU Energy.

References

External links
LG&E and KU Energy Home Page

Electric power companies of the United States
Natural gas companies of the United States
Energy in Kentucky
Companies based in Louisville, Kentucky
Energy companies established in 1998
Non-renewable resource companies established in 1998
American companies established in 1998
1998 establishments in Kentucky